Alex Shaw (22 November 1924 – 4 January 2013) was a Canadian former international soccer player.

Career
After playing with Strathclyde, Shaw signed with Dundee United in 1949, where he played for two seasons, appearing in 12 matches league matches, scoring five goals. In 1952, he played in the National Soccer League with Toronto St. Andrews. He later played with Toronto Thistle and coached Toronto Ulster United.

He made his debut for the Canada men's national soccer team on 6 July 1957 against the United States in a World Cup qualifier match. He died on 4 January 2013 in Perry Sound, Ontario.

References

Canadian soccer coaches
Canadian soccer players
Canada men's international soccer players
Association football inside forwards
Dundee United F.C. players
Canadian National Soccer League players
1924 births
2013 deaths
Footballers from Glasgow
Scottish footballers
Strathclyde F.C. players
Scottish Football League players